Mahesh Dattani (born 7 August 1958) is an Indian director, actor, playwright and writer. He wrote such plays as Final Solutions, Dance Like a Man, Bravely Fought the Queen, On a Muggy Night in Mumbai, Tara, Thirty Days in September and The Big Fat City.

He is the first playwright in English to be awarded the Sahitya Akademi Award. His plays have been directed by eminent directors like Arvind Gaur, Alyque Padamsee and Lillete Dubey.

Early life and background
Mahesh Dattani was born in Bangalore to Gujarati parents. He went to Baldwin Boys High School and then went on to join St. Joseph's College, Bangalore.

Dattani is a graduate in History, Economics and Political Science. He completed his post-graduate in Marketing and Advertising Management because he wanted to become a copywriter. He worked with the Bangalore Little Theatre, where his first role was in Utpal Dutt's Surya Shikhar.

After reading Edward Albee's play Who's Afraid of Virginia Woolf? early in his life, he became interested in writing. He was also influenced by Gujarati playwright Madhu Rye's Kumarni Agashi and developed an interest in play writing.

Career
Mahesh Dattani began his career as a copywriter in an advertising firm. In 1986, he wrote his first full-length play, Where There's a Will, and since 1995, he has been working as a full-time theatre professional. He has also worked with his father in the family business.

Dattani is also a film director. His debut film is Mango Souffle, adapted from one of his plays. He also wrote and directed the movie Morning Raaga.

Mahesh Dattani appeared as a guest on the podcast, The Literary City with Ramjee Chandran.

Playwright 
 Where There's a Will (1988)
 Dance Like a Man (1989)
 Tara (1990)
 Bravely Fought the Queen (1991)
 Final Solutions (1993)
 Do The Needful
 On a Muggy Night in Mumbai (1998)
 Seven Circles Round The Fire (Radio play for BBC) (Seven Steps around the Fire) (1998)
 30 Days in September (2001)
 The Girl Who Touched the Stars (2007)
 Brief Candle (2009)
 Where Did I Leave My Purdah (2012)
 The Big Fat City (2012)

Filmography
Director
 Mango Souffle Morning Raga Dance Like a Man Ek Alag Mausam Awards 

 Dance Like a Man has won the award for the Best Picture in English awarded by the National Panorama in 1998
 Sahitya Academy award for his book of plays Final Solutions and Other Plays Sahitya Kala Parishad selected Final Solutions (1993), Tara (2000) and 30 Days in September (2007) as best productions of the year, directed by Arvind Gaur.

References

9. G Baskaran, ed., Girish Karnad and Mahesh Dattani: Methods and Motives, Yking Books, Jaipur, 2012.

External links
 Bhattacharya, Anindya. "Desire and the Postcolonial Nation" in Seven Steps around the Fire and Final Solutions. The Plays of Mahesh Dattani: An Anthology of Recent Criticism. Ed. Tutun Mukherjee. New Delhi: Pencraft International, 2012, pp. 184–196.
 Roy, Pinaki. "Mahesh Dattani's Final Solutions: A Brief Rereading". Mahesh Dattani: His Stagecraft in Indian Theatre. Ed. Bite, V. New Delhi: Authors Press, 2013, pp. 111–24.
 Das, B.K. "Mahesh Dattani's Dance Like a Man: A Thematic Study". The Atlantic Literary Review 15.3 (2014). Ed. Rama Kundu. New Delhi: Atlantic Pub., 2014, pp. 73–80.
 Das, B.K. "In Search of Shakespearean Echoes in Mahesh Dattani: A Study of The Big Fat City as a Critique of Contemporary Urban Indian Society". Yearly Shakespeare Vol. XIV (2016). Ed. Goutam Ghosal. Santiniketan: Sri Aurobindo Study Centre,  2016 (ISSN 0976-9536), pp. 60–69.
 Das, B.K. "The Tale of an Imperial Kin: Unfolding the East-West Problematic in Mahesh Dattani's The Tale of a Mother Feeding Her Child''". World Journal of Gender & Literature 4.1 (June 2017). Ed. Lata Mishra. New Delhi: Authorspress, 2017 (ISSN 2349-1620), pp. 135–142.

21st-century Indian film directors
Indian male dramatists and playwrights
Indian male stage actors
Male actors from Bangalore
Indian male film actors
Living people
1958 births
Recipients of the Sahitya Akademi Award in English
20th-century Indian dramatists and playwrights
Film directors from Bangalore
Screenwriters from Bangalore
21st-century Indian dramatists and playwrights
20th-century Indian male writers
21st-century Indian male writers
Gujarati people